The 2018–2020 NORCECA Beach Volleyball Continental Cup were a beach volleyball double-gender event. NORCEA is the North, Central America and Caribbean Volleyball Confederation. The winners of the event qualified for the 2020 Summer Olympics.

Aguascalientes Tournament
 Men's Final Standings

 Women's Final Standings

Cayman Islands Tournament
 Men's Final Standings

 Women's Final Standings

Nicaragua Tournament
 Men's Final Standings

 Women's Final Standings

Varadero Tournament
 Men's Final Standings

 Women's Final Standings

La Paz Tournament
 Men's Final Standings

 Women's Final Standings

Punta Cana Tournament
 Men's Final Standings

 Women's Final Standings

Bonaire Tournament
 Men's Final Standings

 Women's Final Standings

Boca Chica Tournament
 Men's Final Standings

 Women's Final Standings

Hato Mayor del Rey Tournament
 Men's Final Standings

 Women's Final Standings

Final Men's Standings

Final Women's Standings

References

External links
Official website

Continental Beach Volleyball Cup
2018 in beach volleyball
2019 in beach volleyball
2020 in beach volleyball